KK Željezničar Sarajevo (Košarkaški klub Željezničar Sarajevo in English: Željezničar Sarajevo Basketball Club), also known as Željezničar Sarajevo is the basketball section of the multi-sport society SD Željezničar, based in Sarajevo, Bosnia and Herzegovina.

History 
Basketball is the second most popular sport in Bosnia-Herzegovina. The men's KK Željezničar team was one of the Yugoslavian clubs from the Bosnian region in the 1960s and 1970s, but when the Yugoslav Wars led to the breakup of the Yugoslav federation in 1992, the men's team ceased to exist. In the overall Yugoslav championship table 1946–1991, the men's KK Željezničar Sarajevo occupies 24th place. They spent six seasons in the top flight.

The women's team, ŽKK Željezničar Sarajevo, continues to exist. It won the Yugoslav championship (in which they were regular participants) in 1971, and lost Yugoslav Basketball Cup final in both 1988 and 1989. Since Bosnia-Herzegovina became independent, with its own basketball league and cup competitions, ŽKK Željezničar has won the Bosnian championship title 9 times, Bosnian Cup 8 times and the WABA League in 2003.

Accomplishments 
Note that all results after 1992 are for ŽKK Željezničar Sarajevo, the women's basketball team from the Željezničar Sarajevo sports club.
Champions of Yugoslav Women's Basketball League (1) - 1971
Basketball Championship of Bosnia and Herzegovina (Women) (11) - 1998, 1999, 2002, 2003, 2004, 2005, 2006, 2007, 2008, 2009, 2010
Basketball Cup of Bosnia and Herzegovina (Women) (9) - 1998, 1999, 2003, 2004, 2005, 2006, 2007, 2008, 2010
WABA League (1) - 2003
National League Winners (12):- 1971, 1998, 1999, 2002, 2003, 2004, 2005, 2006, 2007, 2008, 2009, 2010. There were three separated league and cup competitions in Bosnia and Herzegovina before the 2002/2003 season and, before that season, only several joint play-offs were played to determine one final champion or cup winner. KK Željezničar also won four championship and four cup titles in one of those regions.
Regional champions (4) - 1998, 1999, 2000, 2001.
Regional Cup winners (4) - 1998, 1999, 2000, 2001.

External links 
 Official website of Basketball club
 Website of Željezničar's supporters

Basketball teams in Yugoslavia
Basketball teams in Bosnia and Herzegovina
Sport in Sarajevo